Xenacanthidae is a family of prehistoric sharks in the order Xenacanthida.

References 

Carboniferous sharks
Permian sharks
Triassic sharks
Prehistoric cartilaginous fish families
Carboniferous first appearances
Triassic extinctions